Danish Akhtar Saifi is an Indian wrestler-turned-actor best known for playing the role of Hanuman in the television series Siya Ke Ram. He made his film debut in the 2019 Hindu mythological Kannada film Kurukshetra (based on the Mahabharata) in the character of Bhima. He also appeared in the 2021 Kannada action film Kotigobba 3.

Filmography

Film

Television
2019 stage play Mahabharat

References

Living people
Indian male wrestlers
21st-century Indian male actors
People from Bihar
Year of birth missing (living people)